WLMB (channel 40) is a religious independent television station in Toledo, Ohio, United States, owned by Dominion Broadcasting. The station's studios are located on Capital Commons Drive in Toledo, and its transmitter is located in Jasper, Michigan.

History
The station's first call sign was issued as WXAE-TV on July 17, 1992. It adopted its current call sign on May 17, 1994. However, the station did not commence broadcasting until October 19, 1998.

WLMB was an affiliate of Pax TV from 2000 to 2002, but the station only carried selected original and religious programming.

Programming
WLMB's lineup features religious programming in the mornings and early afternoons, classic TV series in the late afternoons and early evenings, more religious shows during prime time, overnights and all day on Sunday, children's shows on Saturday mornings and infomercials on Saturday afternoons.

Radiant TV

Radiant TV is the brand for WLMB's overnight music block, consisting of nature scenes set to Christian music in a format similar to the now-discontinued Worship Network. WLMB syndicates Radiant TV to other Christian television networks, making it available nationwide.

Awards and honors
 Four-time National Religious Broadcasters (NRB) Television Station of the Year Award winner (2003, 2004, 2007, 2010)
 Seven-time NRB People's Choice Award winner (for various programs)
 2010 Bronze Telly Award for Commercial Production (for an ad for a NW Ohio furniture store)

Subchannels
The station's digital signal is multiplexed:

References

External links

LMB
Television channels and stations established in 1998
1998 establishments in Ohio
Religious television stations in the United States